Triaenodes phalacris is an extinct species of species caddisfly in the family Leptoceridae. It was endemic to the United States.

References

Trichoptera
Extinct animals of North America
Endemic fauna of the United States
Insects of the United States
Insects described in 1938
Taxonomy articles created by Polbot